Venkatesh Narayanamurti (born Bangalore, 1939) is an American scientist, public policy leader and academic administrator.

He studied physics at St. Stephen’s College, Delhi, where he gained his bachelor's degree in 1958 and a master's degree in 1960. He was awarded a PhD by Cornell University in 1965.

Narayanamurti is the Benjamin Pierce Research Professor of Technology and Public Policy at Harvard University where he is a former dean (1998–2008) of the School of Engineering and Applied Sciences. Narayanamurti was elected to membership in the National Academy of Engineering in 1992 for "developments in the field of phonon optics and leadership in electronic materials and device research and development". He also served on the Engineering and Computer Science jury for the Infosys Prize from 2011 to 2015.

He is married with three children.

Publications 

 Cycles of Invention and Discovery: Rethinking the Endless Frontier (2016) 
 The Genesis of Technoscientific Revolutions: Rethinking the Nature and Nurture of Research (2021)

References

1939 births
Living people
Harvard University faculty
Members of the United States National Academy of Engineering
Fellows of the American Physical Society